In linear algebra and statistics, the pseudo-determinant is the product of all non-zero eigenvalues of a square matrix. It coincides with the regular determinant when the matrix is non-singular.

Definition 
The pseudo-determinant of a square n-by-n matrix A may be defined as:

where |A| denotes the usual determinant, I denotes the identity matrix and rank(A) denotes the  rank of A.

Definition of pseudo-determinant using Vahlen matrix
By the pseudo-determinant of the Vahlen matrix for the conformal transformation, we mean 
 

Computation for positive semi-definite case 
If  is  positive semi-definite, then the  singular values and eigenvalues of  coincide. In this case, if the singular value decomposition (SVD) is available, then  may be computed as the product of the non-zero singular values. If all singular values are zero, then the pseudo-determinant is 1.

Supposing , so that k is the number of non-zero singular values, we may write  where  is some n-by-k matrix and the dagger is the conjugate transpose.

Application in statistics
If a statistical procedure ordinarily compares distributions in terms of the determinants of variance-covariance matrices then, in the case of singular matrices, this comparison can be undertaken by using a combination of the ranks of the matrices and their pseudo-determinants, with the matrix of higher rank being counted as "largest" and the pseudo-determinants only being used if the ranks are equal. Thus pseudo-determinants are sometime presented in the outputs of statistical programs in cases where covariance matrices are singular.

See also 
Matrix determinant
Moore–Penrose pseudoinverse, which can also be obtained in terms of the non-zero singular values.

References 

Covariance and correlation
Matrices